Marydale (Allt a’ Mheiligein) is a community in the Canadian province of Nova Scotia, located  in Antigonish County.

References

Further reading

Communities in Antigonish County, Nova Scotia